The Score may refer to:

Films and television
 The Score (1978 film), a 1978 Swedish film, released in Sweden as Lyftet
 The Score (2001 film), a 2001 crime drama film starring Robert De Niro and Edward Norton
 The Score (2005 film), a 2005 science fiction film by Kim Collier starring Jonathon Young
 The Score (2021 film), a British thriller film
 The Score (Philippine TV program), a Philippine sports news television program broadcast on ABS-CBN Sports and Action that debuted in 2014
 The Score (Singaporean TV series), a 2010 Singaporean television drama series broadcast on MediaCorp Channel 8
 The Score (2003 TV program), a 2003 TV documentary with Marc Shaiman and produced by Phil Ramone

Other
 The Score (Fugees album), 1996
 The Score, 2016 album by Aaron Pritchett
 The Score – An Epic Journey, a 2005 album by the symphonic metal band Epica
 The Score (band), American alt-rock band known for the song "Legend"
 theScore, branding of Canadian digital media company Score Media and Gaming Inc.
 WSCR (The Score), a sports radio station in Chicago, Illinois
 WPRV, an AM radio station in Rhode Island that formerly broadcast a sports format as The Score
 WLRO (The Score 1210), an AM sports radio station in Baton Rouge
 WEAN-FM, an FM radio station in Rhode Island that formerly broadcast a sports format as The Score
 Sportsnet 360, formerly The Score Television Network, a Canadian sports channel

See also 
 Score (disambiguation)